The 1942–43 Sheboygan Red Skins season was the Red Skins' fifth year in the United States' National Basketball League (NBL), which was also the fifth year the league existed. Five teams competed in the NBL in 1942–43, the league's lowest number to that point (largely caused by the war), and the league did not use divisions.

The Red Skins played their home games at the Sheboygan Municipal Auditorium and Armory. For the second time in franchise history (1941), the Red Skins advanced to the NBL Championship. They then went on to win their first league title by defeating the Fort Wayne Zollner Pistons, two games to one in a best-of-three series. In the third and deciding game, Ed Dancker made the game-winning shot from the corner with less than five seconds remaining to win the championship.

Head coach Carl Roth won the league's Coach of the Year Award, while player Ken Buehler was named NBL Rookie of the Year. Ed Dancker (First Team), Buddy Jeannette (Second), and Ken Suesens (Second) earned All-NBL honors.

Roster

Note: Ken Buehler was not on the playoffs roster

Regular season

Season standings

Playoffs

Semifinals
(2) Sheboygan Red Skins vs. (3) Oshkosh All-Stars: Sheboygan wins series 2–0
Game 1 @ Sheboygan: Sheboygan 50, Oshkosh 38
Game 2 @ Oshkosh: Sheboygan 56, Sheboygan 47

NBL Championship
(1) Fort Wayne Zollner Pistons vs. (2) Sheboygan Red Skins: Sheboygan wins series 2–1
Game 1 @ Fort Wayne: Sheboygan 55, Fort Wayne 50
Game 2 @ Sheboygan: Fort Wayne 50, Sheboygan 45
Game 3 @ Fort Wayne: Sheboygan 30, Fort Wayne 29

Awards and honors
 NBL Coach of the Year – Carl Roth
 First Team All-NBL – Ed Dancker
 Second Team All-NBL – Buddy Jeannette and Ken Suesens
 NBL Rookie of the Year – Ken Buehler

References

Sheboygan Red Skins seasons
Sheboygan
National Basketball League (United States) championship seasons
Sheboygan Red Skins
Sheboygan Red Skins